Fernando Echeverría Vial (born 19 November 1961) is a Chilean civil engineer and politician who served as Minister of Energy during the first government of Sebastián Piñera.

Early life and education
Echeverria studied at St. Ignatius College, Santiago and then went on to study civil engineering at Pontifical Catholic University of Chile from 1972 to 1978 and then got a degree in business management from the University of Chile.

References

Living people
1967 births
National Renewal (Chile) politicians
21st-century Chilean politicians
Ministers of Energy of Chile
People from Santiago
Pontifical Catholic University of Chile alumni
Stanford University alumni